Cecil Martin Chase (born December 19, 1974) is a former American football defensive tackle in the National Football League. With the New Orleans Saints he was part of a defensive line nicknamed "The Heavy Lunch Bunch", along with fellow 325-pounders Norman Hand and Grady Jackson.  He played college football at the University of Oklahoma.

References 

1974 births
Living people
Sportspeople from Lawton, Oklahoma
American football defensive tackles
Oklahoma Sooners football players
Baltimore Ravens players
New Orleans Saints players
New York Giants players
Washington Redskins players
Jacksonville Jaguars players